Woodbrooke Study Centre is a Quaker college in Selly Oak, Birmingham, England.

The only Quaker Study Centre in Europe, it was founded by George Cadbury in 1903 and occupies his former home on the Bristol Road. Woodbrooke's first Director of Studies was the biblical scholar J. Rendel Harris. Other early staff included Horace Gundry Alexander and Leyton Richards, a prominent pacifist who was appointed as Warden in 1916.

The college was extended between 1907 and 1914 by the addition of a new wing, a new common room and Holland House, a men's hostel. By 1922 it was estimated that 1,250 British students and 400 foreign students had attended the college.

It was federated with eight other nearby colleges, known collectively as Selly Oak Colleges.

Woodbrooke provides short courses on personal spiritual growth, theology, creative arts, and training for Quaker roles. Its Centre for Research in Quaker Studies offers postgraduate taught and research degrees through the Universities of Birmingham and Lancaster.  It is also available for conferences.

Notable alumni
 Gertrud Luckner, Christian social worker involved in the German resistance to Nazism
 Alice Paul, American suffragist, feminist, and women's rights activist
 Margaret Thorp, Australian feminist and peace activist
 Hélène Monastier, Swiss peace activist

References

A History of Woodbrooke College 1953 - 1978 by F Ralph Barlow

External links

Quaker organisations based in the United Kingdom
Education in Birmingham, West Midlands
Quakerism in England
Selly Oak